Trieste is a 1951 Yugoslav drama film directed by France Štiglic.

Cast
 Mira Bedenk as Anda 
 Angelo Benetelli as Penko  
 Sandro Bianchi as Donati  
 Vjekoslav Bonifačić as Burole  
 Alessandro Damiani as Karlo  
 Avgusta Danilova as Stara zenica  
 Flavio della Noce as Piero 
 Josip Fišer as Menih  
 Eliza Gerner as Anamarija  
 Franc Gunzer as Komisar mesta  
 Pavla Kovič as Vratarjeva hci  
 Slavica Kraševec as Marijeta  
 Andrej Kurent as Ivan  
 Anica Kuznik as Vida  
 Marcello Micheli as Moro  
 Carlo Montini as Oliva  
 Lojze Potokar as Just  
 Stane Potokar as Komandir mesta  
 Modest Sancin as Galjof  
 Stane Sever as Borut  
 Zvone Sintic as Tadeo  
 Pero Skerl as Pahor  
 Vladimir Skrbinšek as Schmedke  
 Dusan Skredl as Porocnik  
 Joze Zupan as Sila  
 Mirko Župančić as Sergej

References

Bibliography 
 Silvan Furlan. Filmography of Slovene feature films. Slovenski gledališki in filmski muzej, 1994.

External links 
 

1951 films
1951 drama films
Yugoslav drama films
Slovene-language films
Films set in Trieste
Films directed by France Štiglic
Yugoslav black-and-white films